TransMagic is a commercial computer program that converts computer-aided design (CAD) files from one native file format to another. During the translation process, TransMagic performs “geometry mapping”, mapping from one CAD kernel to another. During the conversion, TransMagic avoids what are known as “stitching errors” by repairing geometry via techniques such as correcting slightly overlapping or misaligned surfaces, removing duplicate control points, and duplicate vertices.

Overview

A large number of CAD programs are on the market, among them Autodesk Inventor, Cobalt, Form-Z, Pro/ENGINEER, and SolidWorks. With rare exceptions, each program saves data files (2D and 3D drawings and 3D solid models) in its own native file format. Since major CAD programs are expensive—several thousand dollars or more—and require great skill and time to master, it is common for individuals and companies to own just one type of program. The existence of many different file types presents no problems when engineers and designers share files within an organization that has standardized upon a common CAD program. However, file-transfer problems can arise when files must be shared with outside individuals who are using a different type of CAD program.

The typical work-around when sharing files with an outside organization is to export the file using two open-file-type standards: IGES, which was released in 1980 by the National Institute of Standards and Technology (then known as the National Bureau of Standards), and STEP, released in 1984/85. The proprietary file format DXF is also a common file format for exchange.

When a file is exported by one CAD program into an intermediate file format and opened in another CAD program, it is not unusual for translation errors to occur. This inability to reliably transfer files between disparate programs is especially problematic with 3D solid modeling software, because of behind-the-scenes technical complexities that arise whenever complex surfaces abut or blend into each other; surfaces no longer align or some features do not translate due to the way CAD programs employ different approaches to handling certain object classes. To minimize translation errors, TransMagic typically—but not always—translates directly from one native CAD kernel to another. Still, “stitching errors” (gaps and overlaps) can occur while trying to import the file and reinterpret geometry. TransMagic's “Auto Repair Wizard” corrects these flaws while translating the file.

TransMagic is available as a stand-alone program. It is also available as a plug-in for many CAD programs so that the Open and Save dialog boxes are extended with TransMagic's functionality.

Supported file types
As of September 2010, TransMagic reads and writes to the following file types:

See also
 List of file formats
 List of file formats (alphabetical)
 List of CAD programs
 Comparison of CAD editors for CAE

Notes

External links
 National Institute of Standards and Technology: The Initial Graphics Exchange Specification (IGES)
 TransMagic, Inc.: Home page
 WikiSTEP.org (public and free content about the international standard ISO 10303 known as STEP)

Computer-aided design software